The reticulated whip snake (Demansia reticulata) is a species of venomous snake in the family Elapidae.

References

Demansia
Snakes of Australia
Reptiles described in 1842
Reptiles of Western Australia